Avanton is a commune in the Vienne department in the Nouvelle-Aquitaine region in western France.

A Bronze Age golden hat was found near Avanton in 1844, see Avanton Gold Cone. It is on display in the National Museum of Archeology in Saint-Germain-en-Laye.

Population

Gallery

See also
Communes of the Vienne department

References

External links

 Official website

Communes of Vienne